Shinuhayr is a village in the Tatev Municipality of the Syunik Province in Armenia. Goris Airport, also known as Shinuhayr Airport, is an airport in the city that has flights within Armenia to Yerevan and other cities.

Demographics

Population 
The Statistical Committee of Armenia reported its population was 2,865 in 2010, up from 2,593 at the 2001 census.

Gallery

References 

Populated places in Syunik Province